A waif usually refers to an orphan or a homeless young person.

Waif or WAIF may also refer to:

 The Waifs, an Australian folk rock band
 WAIF, a former community radio station in Cincinnati, Ohio
 World Aircraft Information Files, a weekly partwork magazine published in 218 issues
 The Waif, a character in the fantasy series A Song of Ice and Fire

See also
 Wife